Sin Poh (Star News) Amalgamated Limited was a Singapore publisher, which published Sin Chew Jit Poh in Singapore and Malaysia, as well as Sin Pin Jit Poh in Penang, Malaysia.

The Malaysia editions were sold to a Malaysian businessman in 1982. In 1975, due to the a new legislation of Singapore, the assets and the rights to publish Singapore edition of Sin Chew Jit Poh, was sold to Sin Chew Jit Poh (Singapore) Limited, but the descendant of the founder, the Aw family, retained some of the management shares. In 1977, Sin Chew Jit Poh (Singapore) Limited made an initial public offering to sell the ordinary shares of the company and merged to form Singapore News and Publications Limited, a predecessor of Singapore Press Holdings in 1982.

History
Newspapers Sin Chew Jit Poh and Sin Pin Jit Poh were founded by Chinese billionaire Aw Boon Haw in January 1929 and in 1939 respectively, in Singapore and Penang of the Straits Settlements; the publisher of Sin Chew Jit Poh was incorporated in 1928 and its parent company Sin Poh (Star News) Amalgamated Limited was incorporated in 1941.

After the death of Aw Boon Haw in 1954, the Singapore and Malaysia editions were parted away from Hong Kong editions of "Star Newspapers" and "Tiger Standard", which the Hong Kong editions was majority owned by the late Aw Boon Haw's daughter Sally Aw, as well as Aw Toke Tone the grandson of the late Aw Boon Haw; the Thai edition of "Star Newspapers" were also owned by Aw family but not under the Singapore-incorporated "Sin Poh (Star News) Amalgamated".

In 1966, Sin Poh (Star News) Amalgamated purchased a land in Petaling Jaya, Malaysia to build its Malaysian bureau. Since then, the Malaysia edition built their own content which started to distinguish itself with Singapore counterpart.

Went public
In December 1969, the Singapore-based descendant of the late Aw Boon Haw and his brother, late Aw Boon Par, took most of the assets of "Haw Par Brothers (Private) Limited" public, becoming Haw Par Brothers International. The assets included Sin Poh (Star News) Amalgamated.

Privatization
However, the company was takeover by Slater Walker in June 1971; Aw family became a minority shareholder. At the same time, Aw Cheng Chye, eldest son of the late Aw Boon Par, acquired Sin Poh (Star News) Amalgamated Limited from Haw Par Brothers International. Aw Cheng Chye was also the chairman of Sin Poh (Star News) Amalgamated at that time. However, in the same year Aw Cheng Chye died in Santiago de Chile.

In May 1971, Aw Kow, the eldest son of the late Aw Boon Haw, also resigned as the director of Sin Poh (Star News) Amalgamated as well as managing director of Sin Chew Jit Poh. A scandal was exposed that English newspaper Eastern Sun he founded in 1966, was supported by Chinese intelligence service based in Hong Kong, according to Singapore Government. Sin Poh (Star News) Amalgamated made a press release in May 1971, declaring that they have no relation with Eastern Sun.

Despite Star News itself was not affected, in that year saw the closure of Eastern Sun, the arrest of the chairman of Nanyang Siang Pau Press, as well as other event regarding newspaper. Ironically, despite accused of connection to the People's Republic of China that affect Singapore's internal securities, Aw Kow was never charged and jailed.

Without Aw Kow, Frank Wong was also promoted as the general manager of Sin Chew Jit Poh (Singapore) in December 1972. The position was previously served by Aw Swan, second son of late Aw Boon Haw from 25 June 1971 to circa 1972.

Nevertheless, the Government of Singapore started another reform on the media that affected Star News in 1975.

Dismantle
Due to Newspaper and Printing Presses Act, a legislation enacted in 1974, the Singapore edition was owned by a newly incorporated company Sin Chew Jit Poh (Singapore) Limited, which saw Aw family (such as widow of Aw Cheng Chye and her son Aw Toke Soon, as well as Aw It Haw, the fourth son of the late Aw Boon Haw), editors of Sin Chew Jit Poh (such as Frank Wong, Goh Seah Hiong and Lu Kuang Chi) and Singapore sovereign wealth fund Temasek became the majority owner (via ordinary share and management share) from 1975 until initial public offering of ordinary share in 1977. The management share was some sort of golden share on "any resolution relating to the appointment or dismissal of a director or any member of the staff of a newspaper company but shall in all other respects have the same voting rights as the holder of ordinary shares.", which make the ordinary in some event, inferior to management share. For Aw family, without a majority in management share, ordinary share and number of directors, making the newspaper no longer part of the tools of the family to get influence to the public.

Moreover, in August 1978, only one of the member of the board of directors was from Aw family: Aw It Haw. The management shares held by the widow of Aw Cheng Chye and her son Aw Toke Soon, as well as Goh Seah Hiong, Lu Kuang Chi (who both resigned as directors in August) and Lim Pang Kwang, were converted to ordinary shares in October 1978. The issue of new management shares in June 1979 further diluted Aw It Haw's voting rights in term of the number of management share.

The Singapore edition was merged with competitor, Singapore edition of Nanyang Siang Pau to form Lianhe Zaobao and Lianhe Wanbao in 1983. Announced by the Singapore Government and the companies in April 1982, their parent companies was merged in 1982 as Singapore News and Publications. In 1984, Singapore News and Publications was again merged with the publisher of The Straits Times, forming the monopoly Singapore Press Holdings.

Nevertheless, the Malaysia editions were also sold to a Malaysian businessman Lim Kheng Kim in 1982, which the publisher of the editions was known as "Sin Poh (Star News) Amalgamated (Malaysia) 	Sendirian Berhad".

Footnotes

References

Newspaper companies of Singapore
Newspaper companies of Malaysia
1941 establishments in Singapore
Mass media companies established in 1941
Family-owned companies of Singapore
Aw family